John Cady may refer to:

John W. Cady (1790–1854), U.S. Representative from New York
John Cady (golfer) (1866–1933), American golfer